Our Lady of Luxembourg is a devotion to the Blessed Virgin Mary in Luxembourg, called under the Marian title of Comforter of the Afflicted.

History

A Jesuit devotion to promote the Catholic faith in Luxembourg 
The devotion to Our Lady Consolatrix Afflictorum was initiated in Luxembourg by the Jesuits in 1624 and led to the election of Our Lady as the protectress of the City in 1666 and of the Duchy in 1678. After the destruction of the old pilgrimage chapel at the time of the French Revolution, the statue of Our Lady of Luxembourg was moved to the former Saint Peter church, today renamed as Notre-Dame Cathedral in Luxembourg City.

Spreading the devotion: Our Lady of Kevelaer 
From there the devotion was adopted by the English Benedictine nuns of Cambrai as well as in Kevelaer in Germany since 1 June 1642. Following an apparition in that place, an image of Our Lady of Luxembourg was placed there. The devotion spreads not only to the historical provinces of Luxembourg in Lorraine or Belgium but also beyond the oceans as in the United States and even India, helped by the work of Jesuit missionaries.

Becoming a national emblem of Luxembourg 
From the 19th century, as Luxembourg emerged as nation-state, the Consolatrix Afflictorum was more often referred to as Our Lady of Luxembourg, signing an strong association between the Luxembourgish identity and the devotion to Our Lady.

Representation

Statue of our Lady of Luxembourg 

The statue  of Our Lady of Luxembourg is currently enshrined in the Cathedral of Our Lady in Luxembourg city.

Statues depicting Our Lady Consolatrix Afflictorum can be found in niches in buildings throughout the city of Luxembourg.

Luxembourgish painter Michel Engels depicted a romantic version of the Consolatrix Afflictorum as the  Allegorie de la Patria above the city of Luxembourg, showing that  "it is under her watchful and protective eye that the nation achieved its political liberation".

Takenplatte: fireplace fireback in honor of Our Lady of Luxembourg 

As a form of devotion to our Lady of Luxembourg, Takenplatte or firebacks were moulded with her image. They usually depict the Virgin Mary with the Child Jesus, holding a scepter, keys and high crown. Her veil falls down to the ground as a bridal symbol. Above Mary, putti hold a crown of clasps over her crowned head.

It was a very popular plate motif of which several casts have survived. The model has been in use for over 300 years, as dateable casts from 1708 to 1803 have been preserved. Our record is more spartan in nature.

Comparable plates with the identical main motif often have dates, banners and ornamental decorative elements.
At first glance, the picture on the Takenplatte bears very little resemblance to the Madonna standing in the Luxembourg Cathedral. This can be explained by the fact that this Madonna was always wrapped in precious clothes for centuries and is also shown on the Takenplatte, among other things. It was only during the last renovation in 2008 that the Madonna's robes were removed.

Hymnology 
Various hymns have been composed in honour of Our Lady of Luxembourg, the two most popular being O Mamm, léif Mamm do uewen and Léif Mamm, ech weess et net ze son. These two hymns were written in Luxembourgish language. During World War II, they took an even greater significance as their singing was outlawed by the Third Reich which considered them to be too "patriotic". Well into the 21st century, they remain chosen hymns of the Archdiocese of Luxembourg. 

Originating from Mullendorff, “O Mamm, leif Mamm do uewen” won citizenship at the Cathedral of Luxembourg and was set to music by P. A. Barthel.

Léif Mamm, ech weess et net ze son was composed by Luxembourgish priest Josef Biwer in the first half of the twentieth century. It is considered as one of the "Nationallieder" or national hymns of Luxembourg.

Devotion: the Oktav 

The devotion to Our Lady of Luxembourg is celebrated with great solemnity during the Oktav, which is a two-week celebration which ends with a pontifical mass celebrated by the archbishop in presence of the Grand Duke, who also takes part in the eucharistic procession and the renewal of the consecration to our Lady.

References 

Virgin Mary in art
Society of Jesus
Titles of Mary
May observances
Religion in Luxembourg